Melaneelithanallur block is a revenue block in the Tirunelveli district of Tamil Nadu, India. It has a total of 25 panchayat villages.

References 

 

Revenue blocks of Tirunelveli district